Albert Marsh was a sergeant in the United States Army and a Medal of Honor recipient for his role in the American Civil War.

Marsh joined the Union Army from Randolph, New York, in August 1861. He fought in the Battles of Fair Oaks (aka Seven Pines), Gettysburg, and Spotsylvania, and was wounded each time. He was mustered out in September 1864.

He died February 17, 1895, and is buried in Randolph Cemetery, Randolph, New York.

Medal of Honor citation
Rank and organization: Sergeant, Company B, 64th New York Infantry. Place and date: At Spotsylvania, Va., May 12, 1864. Entered service at: Randolph, N.Y. Birth: Cattaraugus County, N.Y. Date of issue: December 1, 1864.

Citation:

Capture of flag.

See also

 List of Medal of Honor recipients
 List of American Civil War Medal of Honor recipients: M–P

Notes

References

 

1831 births
1895 deaths
United States Army Medal of Honor recipients
People from Randolph, New York
United States Army soldiers
People of New York (state) in the American Civil War
Military personnel from New York (state)
American Civil War recipients of the Medal of Honor